Shaligham (also Romanized as Shalīgham) is a village in Seyyed Abbas Rural District, Shavur District, Shush County, Khuzestan Province, Iran. At the 2006 census, its population was 156, in 26 families.

References 

Populated places in Shush County